David Vaughan (died c. 1720) was a Hudson's Bay Company captain who sailed with George Berley under the overall command of the explorer James Knight on an ill-fated expedition to discover the Northwest Passage.

Capt. David Vaughan was aboard the Discovery with Knight, the expedition leader. We know that they were shipwrecked at Marble Island, along with the Albany and Capt. Berley. The remains of the camp where they all perished, were discovered many years later by the explorer, Samuel Hearne.

References

Explorers of Canada
Hudson's Bay Company people
Year of birth uncertain
Year of death uncertain
1720s deaths